Elisson or Elissonas may refer to:

Elissonas (Arcadia), a small river Arcadia, Greece
Elissonas (Corinthia), a small river in Corinthia, Greece
Elissonas (Alfeios), a river in Arcadia, Greece, tributary of the Alfeios
Elissonas, a small river near Amaliada in the western Peloponnesus